Patricia Anne Wettig (born December 4, 1951) is an American actress and playwright. She is best known for her role as Nancy Weston in the television series Thirtysomething (1987–1991), for which she received a Golden Globe Award and three Primetime Emmy Awards.

After her breakthrough role in Thirtysomething, Wettig has appeared in a number of films, including Guilty by Suspicion  (1991), City Slickers (1991), City Slickers II: The Legend of Curly's Gold (1994), and The Langoliers (1995). She returned to television playing a leading role in the 1995 short-lived drama Courthouse and later played Caroline Reynolds in the Fox drama Prison Break (2005–2007) and Holly Harper in the ABC family drama Brothers & Sisters (2006–2011).

Early life
Wettig was born in Milford, Ohio, to Florence (née Morlock) and Clifford Neal Wettig, a high school basketball coach. She has three sisters: Pam, Phyllis, and Peggy. She was raised in Grove City, Pennsylvania and graduated in 1970. She attended Ohio Wesleyan University and graduated from Temple University in 1975. She returned to her studies later in life and received a Master of Fine Arts in playwriting from Smith College in 2001. F2M, a play she authored, was performed in 2011 as part of the New York Stage and Film and Vassar College's 2011 Powerhouse Theater season.

Career  
Wettig began her career on stage and worked as a personal dresser for Shirley MacLaine. On television, she appeared in episodes of 1980s dramas Remington Steele, Hill Street Blues and L.A. Law, before taking a recurring role as Joanne McFadden in the NBC medical drama series St. Elsewhere from 1986 to 1987. Later in 1987, Wettig was cast as Nancy Weston in the ABC drama series thirtysomething.

For her role in Thirtysomething, Wettig received critical acclaim. Her portrayal of Nancy's cancer struggle attracted considerable acclaim and attention.  She won three Primetime Emmy Awards: for Outstanding Supporting Actress in a Drama Series in 1988, and for Outstanding Lead Actress in a Drama Series in 1990 and 1991.   
In 1991, she won Golden Globe Award for Best Actress – Television Series Drama. The series ended in 1991 after four seasons. Later that year, she made her big screen debut in the drama film Guilty by Suspicion starring opposite Robert De Niro and Annette Bening. She played Billy Crystal's wife in the comedy films City Slickers (1991) and City Slickers II: The Legend of Curly's Gold (1994). In 1993, she had a leading role in the comedy-drama film Me and Veronica .

Wettig has starred in a number of made-for-television movies, include Taking Back My Life: The Nancy Ziegenmeyer Story (1992) and Parallel Lives (1994). She played the role of Laurel Stevenson in the 1995 Stephen King's miniseries The Langoliers. Later in 1995, she returned to television with a leading role of tough female judge in the CBS drama series Courthouse. Wettig intended to leave the show due to "creative differences", with sources saying that she wanted the show to be more of a star vehicle for her, rather than an ensemble cast, but the show was cancelled before her character could be written out.

In 2002, Wettig was a regular cast member in the short-lived Bravo drama series Breaking News. From 2002 to 2004, she played the recurring role of CIA psychotherapist Dr. Judy Barnett on Alias (on which her husband was an executive producer and director). From 2005 to 2007, Wettig appeared in 18 episodes of Fox television drama, Prison Break, playing fictional Vice President Caroline Reynolds. She turned down Fox's offer of becoming a series regular on Prison Break in order to pursue the ABC comedy-drama series Brothers & Sisters, which debuted in September 2006. Wettig starred in the series as the Walker family patriarch's mistress, Holly Harper. She left the show midway through the show's fifth and final season after her character   executive Holly Harper followed her daughter to New York along with her fiancé David played by real life husband Ken Olin.

In 2012, Wettig joined the national tour for  Larry Kramer's production, The Normal Heart. In 2014, she starred in the unsold the CW drama pilot Identity opposite Ahna O'Reilly In 2019, she played a leading role in the episode of Netflix anthology series Heartstrings.  In 2020, ABC ordered a sequel for Thirtysomething and Wettig set to return alongside Olin, Timothy Busfield and Mel Harris.

Personal life
Wettig is married to actor and producer Ken Olin; they have a son Clifford (born 1983) and a daughter Roxy (born 1985).

Filmography

Film

Television films

Television series

Awards and nominations

References

External links

 

1951 births
Living people
20th-century American dramatists and playwrights
American film actresses
American stage actresses
American television actresses
Ohio Wesleyan University alumni
Actresses from Pittsburgh
Smith College alumni
Best Drama Actress Golden Globe (television) winners
Outstanding Performance by a Lead Actress in a Drama Series Primetime Emmy Award winners
Outstanding Performance by a Supporting Actress in a Drama Series Primetime Emmy Award winners
Actresses from Ohio
20th-century American actresses
21st-century American actresses